The Lyne Water is a tributary of the River Tweed that rises in the Pentland Hills of southern Scotland at Baddinsgill Reservoir. It runs through West Linton and Romannobridge, passes Flemington and Lyne Station and enters the Tweed west of Peebles. It floods regularly in winter and occasionally in summer. There is free fishing above Flemington Bridge, and below Flemington fishing in the river is administered by the Peebles fishing authority.

Etymology
The name Lyne was recorded first as Lyn in around 1190, and is of Brittonic origin. Unlike most rivers named Lyne, it is derived from lïnn, generally meaning "a pool" (Welsh llyn).

See also
Lyne
Lyne Kirk
Lyne Viaduct
List of places in the Scottish Borders
List of places in East Lothian
List of places in Midlothian
List of places in West Lothian

References

External links

RCAHMS: Border Union Railway, River Lyne Bridge to Harker Section

SCRAN: View of West Linton from the ford of the River Lyne (West Linton Historical Association)
Roman fort, fortlet and camps at Hallyne, Lyne
Lyne Farm

Rivers of the Scottish Borders
1Lyne